"Madonna: The Unauthorized Rusical" is the seventh episode of the twelfth season of the American reality competition television series RuPaul's Drag Race, which aired on VH1 on April 10, 2020. The episode has contestants perform a musical about Madonna for the main challenge. Alexandria Ocasio-Cortez and Winnie Harlow serve as guest judges, alongside regular panelists RuPaul, Michelle Visage, and Carson Kressley.

During the challenge, contestants are required to record their own vocals to Madonna-inspired songs, then dance and lip-sync on the main stage as they embody Madonna at different points in her career. Visage assisted with the vocal recording process alongside producers Erik Paparozzi and David Benjamin Steinberg; choreography was provided by Jamal Sims.

The runway theme was "Night of 1,000 Michelle Visages". RuPaul named Gigi Goode the winner. Brita and Heidi N Closet placed in the bottom two. After lip-syncing to Madonna's "Burning Up", Brita was eliminated from the competition.

Results

Lip sync 

  The contestant was eliminated after their third time in the bottom.

Reception
Paul McCallion of Vulture.com rated the episode 4 out of 5 stars. Bustle Kayla Blanton wrote, "If next season gets a Rusical, this one will be hard to top." Out Mikelle Street published a review of the episode called "Drag Race's Madonna Rusical Was One of the Best in Herstory".

See also 

 List of Rusicals

References

External links
 Madonna: The Unauthorized Rusical at IMDb

2020 American television episodes
American LGBT-related television episodes
Cultural depictions of Madonna
RuPaul's Drag Race episodes